Verrucaria serpuloides is a species of saxicolous (rock-dwelling), crustose lichen belonging to the family Verrucariaceae. It is native to the Antarctic Peninsula. It is one of only two permanently submerged species of lichen, the other being Hydrothyria venosa, and the only one found permanently submerged in a marine environment. Collections of the species were first made in 1944 by Elke Mackenzie.

It creates jet-black patches on the base of submerged rocks. It uses green algae as a symbiont.

See also
 List of Verrucaria species

References

External links

serpuloides
Lichen species
Lichens described in 1948
Lichens of the Antarctic